Wendy Boss is an American botanist and the current William Neal Reynolds Distinguished Professor Emeritus at North Carolina State University. Her research focuses on plant physiology and phosphoinositide mediated signalling in plants. Phosphoinositols are derived from the phospholipids found in plasma membrane of the cell. Phosphoinositols are known to be key molecules in signal transduction pathways. The role of this chemical in plants is however not well understood and Dr. Boss' research has contributed significantly towards understanding this topic.

Early life and education 
Boss received her Bachelor of Science degree from Wake Forest University in 1968. Subsequently, she completed a Master of Science in 1970 from University of Washington. She was awarded a Doctorate of Philosophy from Indiana University in 1977.

Career and research 
The Boss lab works on phosphoinositide metabolism in plants. Primarily, the research focuses on the role of the chemicals phosphatidyl-inositol-4P and phosphatidyl-inositol-4,5P in signal transduction in plants while adapting to environmental changes. In 2001 Dr. Boss received grants from NASA, NSF and the USDA's Binational Agricultural Research Development (BARD) program to study the role of this chemicals in plants grown in space. The research measured the chemical surges occurring in plant cells moments after the plant is reoriented and the response time required by plants to adapt to the reorientation.

Honors and awards 
 Inaugural fellow of American Society of Plant Biologists, 2007
 Charles Reid Barnes Life membership award, 2015 awarded by American Society of Plant Biologists
 William Neal Reynolds Distinguished Professor Emeritus at the North Carolina State University
 Pioneer Member of the American Society of Plant Biologists.

References 

American women botanists
North Carolina State University faculty
Indiana University alumni
Living people
University of Washington alumni
Wake Forest University alumni
Year of birth missing (living people)
Place of birth missing (living people)
American women academics
21st-century American women